Olympia Provisions Public House, formerly known as OP Wurst, is a public house in Portland, Oregon owned and operated by Olympia Provisions

History
In 2016, Olympia Provisions opened a small bar-restaurant in Pine Street Market called OP Wurst. The restaurant served artisan frankfurters, sausages, and beer. Later that year, the company opened a second OP Wurst location in Oregon City at Oregon City Brewing. 

In March 2017, a third location opened on Division Street in Southeast Portland's Richmond neighborhood. The Division Street location was the first OP Wurst located in a stand-alone building. This third location was located in a building that formerly housed Honky Tonk Taco, an unrelated taco shop started by Olympia Provisions owners Tilden, Schwartz, and Gaston, that closed after being open for only three months. The location has an outdoor patio, which the bar-restaurant frequently uses to host events such as Oktoberfest, and in the winter hosts a Christmas tree lot.

In May 2018, OP Wurst temporarily closed its bars and rebranded as Olympia Provisions Public House. The new concept serves Apline-themed food based on owner Elias Cairo's apprenticeship in Switzerland. The rebranding took place partially because customers did not recognize that OP Wurst was connected to the Olympia Provisions brand. Olympia Provisions Public House serves German-style beer from a local brewery, Rosenstadt Brewery, and serves a home-base for the brewery's beer.

In October 2019, Olympia Provisions closed the public house location in Pine Street Market to focus on their wholesale business. During the COVID-19 pandemic, the restaurant expanded outdoor seating into the parking lot and operated a take-out service.

Locations
Downtown Portland at Pine Street Market (opened 2016; closed 2019)
Oregon City at Oregon City Brewing (opened 2016)
Southeast Portland on SE Division Street, Richmond (opened 2017)

See also
 List of German restaurants

References

External links

 
 

2016 establishments in Oregon
Restaurants in Oregon City, Oregon
Restaurants established in 2016
Restaurants in Oregon
German restaurants in Portland, Oregon
Richmond, Portland, Oregon